Sulita Waisega is a Fijian rugby union player.

Biography 
Waisega moved to the Netherlands with her parents when she was three. She plays rugby for the Haagsche Rugby Club.

Waisega was named in the Fijiana squad for the 2022 Oceania Championship in New Zealand. She scored a try on her international debut in the Fijiana's 152–0 trouncing of Papua New Guinea. She was selected for the Fijiana squad to the 2021 Rugby World Cup in New Zealand.

References 

Living people
Female rugby union players
Fijian female rugby union players
Fiji women's international rugby union players
2004 births